Manoir du Chatenet is a manor house in Dordogne, Aquitaine, France.

Châteaux in Dordogne